The University of Birmingham Guild of Students (previously Birmingham University Guild of Students; BUGS) is the officially recognised body that represents around 37,000 students at the University of Birmingham. The Guild functions as a students' union as per the Education Act 1994.

History
The Institution had its first foundations in the Mason Science College in the centre of Birmingham around 1876. The university itself formally received its Royal Charter in 1900, with the Guild of Students being provided for as a Student Representative Council. As a consequence, both the Guild and the university officially celebrated their centenaries in 2000. Mason College had had a union of sorts with a club house opening in Great Charles Street in 1905.  The Guild of Students, having been provided for in the 1900 Charter, was formed in 1909 as the Guild of Undergraduates, being based at Edgbaston.

The Guild possesses archives that go back to the First World War, establishing a very long tradition of what is referred to as 'modern Students' Unionism'. Alongside Liverpool Guild of Students, the Guild was a founding member of the National Union of Students.

The Guild of Students occupies the Union Building (often referred to as just 'the Guild'), situated at the edge of campus by the East Gate, for a peppercorn rent from the university. The building itself, by Holland W. Hobbiss, dates to 1928 and has been added to and amended, most significantly in the 1950s, when a south wing was added, and again in the 1960s, when a much larger west wing was built. At 10,000 square metres, it is one of the largest Student Union buildings in the UK.

It is not known for certain why the organisation is named a 'Guild of Students' as opposed to a 'Union of Students', in line with the vast majority of its English peers. It shares its name with five other student unions, including Liverpool Guild of Students and University of Exeter Students' Guild.

The Guild introduced new branding in 2007, intended to replace the previous 'BUGS' brand, which had been adopted in 2000.

Activities

The Guild provides representation to all students at the university and campaigns to create change on issues affecting students at a local and national level. This is achieved through regular meetings with University Senior Officers and Managers, as well as through lobbying Birmingham City Council, the Government and other bodies. The Guild also runs campaigns focused on particular issues; campaigns have included a drive to see wheelie bins across the city, an initiative to improve campus security and have the university install CCTV across all halls of residence, and strong participation in the NUS campaign against the introduction of £3,000 top-up fees (a campaign that continues, despite the measure being approved by Parliament in January 2004).

The Guild boasts 24/7 welfare support channels for its members. Guild Advice provides professional and impartial advice on all manner of student issues, from academic problems, financial woes, immigration and other international troubles, housing worries, and employment rights. It also arranges individual representation for students facing academic appeals, disciplinary hearings and other procedures. All students in halls of residence can seek similar advice from their team of Student Mentors, who are on hand day or night for emergency issues, while Niteline provides a confidential listening and information service through telephone and email overnight. The Guild's welfare services are complemented by the Job Zone, which seeks and promotes part-time student vacancies, and the liberation associations.

With one of its three constitutional objects being to promote 'social intercourse', the Guild maintains social space, bars and event nights; all of these provide an income, without which initiatives including campaigns, the ARC, Job Zone, Niteline and many student groups would struggle to exist. The major weekly night is Saturday's 'Fab 'N' Fresh', with other popular events including 'Very Important Tuesdays' (VIT), which have hosted acts such as Samantha Mumba, Wheatus and Cyndi Lauper, society-themed evenings such as 'The Mix', student group events and irregular gigs and comedy evenings. Further commercial revenue is generated through marketing and retail activities, including a supermarket, and the Guild acts as the official retailer of university branded merchandise for this purpose.

The Guild finished a £4 million redevelopment in July 2010, with the ground floor of the building being completely overhauled, creating for the first time a dedicated membership area with all of the key services in one place. In addition, the brand new bar started serving food, and the Guild opened its very own letting agent, the SHAC.

Societies & volunteering 
The Guild also supports over 300 student groups and societies, actively promoting student involvement, volunteering and social participation. Its oldest society is Carnival, the Guild's charitable RAG (Raising And Giving) society, while one of its newest is Occult and Paranormal Society; all manner of groups, such as Fetish Society, Rock Music, Circus, InterVol (International Volunteers), Mountaineering, and Jazz and Blues, come in between.

The Guild publishes a newspaper called Redbrick. It also has a radio station, Burn FM, which broadcasts online via its website during Autumn and Spring Terms, and Guild Television, the university's student TV station. All three media outlets are editorially independent and are encouraged to hold the Guild Executive to account. However, as the groups and the Executive are all part of the same organisation, the trustees reserve the right to edit content that poses legal or other risks to the Guild, which at times has caused friction amid claims of political censorship.

Birmingham's student guild has a particularly high number of drama societies, collectively referred to as 'Guild Drama'. These societies coexist within the space of the Guild, with different groups dedicated to classical theatre ( Article 19), new writing and improv (Watch This Society For Original Theatre), pantomimes (Panto Society), musicals (Guild Musical Theatre Group, colloquially known as GMTG), and stand-up comedy (The Birmingham Footnotes Comedy Society) to name a few. Each society produces roughly 1-2 shows per term, usually within the Guild itself, but occasionally branching out into site specific performance within the university grounds. There have also been some instances of drama societies within The Guild staging productions at the Midlands Art Centre, the Edinburgh Fringe Festival and National Student Drama Festival.

The Guild has a Student Groups department, which hosts and supports a large variety of student-led societies and volunteering projects. Notable societies and projects include:

The Computer Science Society 
The Computer Science Society at the University of Birmingham, often referred to as CSS, is the official Computer Science society at the University of Birmingham. The society has won two awards in 2017, namely the "Society of the Year" and "Outstanding Event" awards and since then have also won the "Community Award" in 2019 and "The Great Achievement in EPS Award" in 2020.

The society also actively encourages its members to improve their skills by making pull requests on their GitHub to make changes and improvements to the official website, giving members practise at using essential skills needed in the industry but not taught at the university. In addition to this they also run hackathons that members can attend to learn new skills and meet new people.

CSS also regularly host workshops to guide students through important information they will need to succeed in the industry. They work with the Google Developer Student Clubs in order to effectively deliver peer-to-peer learning of programming concepts and logic to ensure students are properly prepared for real world problems. The School of Computer Science is one of the biggest schools at the university with over 460 students enrolled in 2021.

ValeFest
ValeFest, also known as Vale Festival, is a one-day music festival organised entirely by student volunteers from the Guild of Students. The festival is Europe's largest student-run charity festival, and takes place annually on the Vale Village grounds. Since its inception in 2004, ValeFest has supported over 20 different grassroots charities based in the UK and abroad, ranging from domestic abuse charities, to LGBTQ+ community organisations, to natural disaster relief efforts, to mental health charities. Some of these charities include Helen Bamber Foundation, Macmillan Cancer Support, Shelterbox UK and Birmingham Children's Hospital. In the time since the festival began, the society have raised roughly £200,000 for various charitable causes.

As of the last event pre-pandemic, ValeFest 2019, the festival comprises a main stage, second stage, dance tent, comedy stage, lakefront stage and a community bandstand. As well as live music provided by a mixture of contracted acts, current student bands and returning alumni, the festival frequently features demonstrations from societies such as BattleSoc, Acapella Society and Footnotes Comedy Society. The event culminates with a headline act on the main stage. Previous headliners who have performed at the festival include: The Mouse Outfit, Fickle Friends and The Hunna.

In 2020 and 2021, ValeFest produced digital festivals by hosting a number of livestreams across YouTube. The festival is said to return to Birmingham's Vale Village in June 2022 for the first time in almost 3 years.

The Astronomical Society
The University of Birmingham Astronomical Society, generally known as AstroSoc, is the official astronomical society of the University of Birmingham. It was formed on the 2nd March, 1909, and is one of the oldest societies still running at the Guild of Students. The society meets weekly for general meetings, which include observing nights, talks and presentations. As of 2023, the society owns a large and diverse collection of telescopes, including a 12" Meade Lightbridge Dobsonain, a 10" Sky-watcher Dobsonian, and several smaller electronic go-to telescopes. It is also the custodian of the University's historic Cooke refractor, which was purchased in 1910 as a part of the original observatory on the Edgebaston campus and is now situated in a dome on top of the Poynting Building. 

The society also runs programmes to improve the public understanding of astronomy. These include a series of public talks known as the Patrick Moore Lecture Series, Tea, Talk and Telescope. AstroSoc also participate in the university's Astronomy in the City events, which include astronomy and astrophysics talks, and the chance for the general public to observe the night sky. The Society hosts a number of social events throughout the year, including an annual formal dinner, summer camping trip, and bar crawl. 

In 2006, the Society won the Institute of Physics' Best Student Group. In 2003 and 2005, the Society won the best website of a student society. Past Chair of the Society Samuel George won the 2007 Guild Awards Ross Barlow Memorial for most outstanding individual student for his work with AstroSoc. In 2009, it was awarded 'Best Event' at the University of Birmingham at the annual 'Guild Awards'. 

In more recent years, it won the EPS (Engineering and Physical Sciences) societies Outreach Award in 2014, the Outstanding Event Award in 2018, and the Outreach Award for Continued Excellence in both 2019 and 2020.

InterVol
InterVol is an international volunteering charity that was founded at the Guild, notable for being the first Guild volunteering project or society to become a registered charity in the United Kingdom.

InterVol was set up as a society in 2003 by a group of students brought together by the Involve (now Student Development) department at the University of Birmingham Guild of Students.

InterVol focuses on student-led sustainable development projects overseas that aim to make a long term difference to children, communities and the environment. InterVol works in close partnership with local NGOs in each country. InterVol became a registered charity in England and Wales in May 2010. InterVol's charitable objects are to act as a resource for international volunteers at universities in the United Kingdom while promoting development projects that focus on education, health, conservation and the relief of poverty.

Debating Society
The University of Birmingham Debating Society is the largest debating society on campus; it practises debating in the British Parliamentary Style as do other university debating societies, such as Oxford Union, Cambridge Union and Durham Union Society.

The society runs weekly workshops and holds regular public debates, where anyone at the University of Birmingham can see guest speakers debate.

The society holds an annual Inter-Varsity competition and regularly competes in national and international Inter-Varsity debating competitions, such as the World Debating Championships. In 2009, the society was ranked 11th in the UK according to Britishdebate.com. The society is currently ranked 96th in the World based on the last five World Debating Competitions.

Governance

The Guild is a students' union for the purposes of the Education Act 1994. Under section 67 of the Act, all students of the university are by law automatically members of the Guild unless they deliberately opt out; the role of the Guild is to represent this body of membership. However, the University of Birmingham does not disclose any details of its students to the Guild, which naturally makes the Guild's job of democratically representing its membership something of a challenge.

The Guild's constitution sets out in detail how the organisation should be run.

The Guild's sovereign body and Union Council is Guild Council, made up of elected councillors representing academic, student group and hall of residence constituencies, as well as 12 who have a cross-campus mandate. There are 130 seats on Guild Council. The role of Guild Council is legislative: it hears, debates and votes on policy proposals to guide the Guild Executive; it holds the Executive to account over their actions in pursuit of approved policy and their duties generally; and it has a role in setting the Guild's priorities.

In August 2008, the Guild moved from its previous model of an unincorporated association to become a charitable company limited by guarantee (CLG) and, as result, a Trustee Board was established to provide guidance, expertise and strategic oversight of the Guild of Students. The Guild became a charity in 2010.

This decision was made following a Referendum that took place in February 2008 and was approved by over 4,000 students, the Executive, Guild Council and the university. Key to the governance review was a need to clarify how decisions were made and by whom, especially in respect to the role of the Trustee Board and Guild Council.

The Trustees have ultimate responsibility for the day-to-day management of the Guild, which is delegated to the Chief Executive and Management Team. They ensure the Guild remains legally compliant and solvent, in accordance with Memorandum and Articles of Association, the By-laws and Guidance and Strategy documents. In the past, when it had far fewer members than today, this group of trustees was Guild Council. The Trustee Board is now made up of seven Sabbatical (Officer) Trustees; four Student Trustees, with at least one undergraduate, one postgraduate and one international student; and seven external trustees, one of whom is a nominee from the university.

Executive
Day-to-day, and in the absence of Guild Council over University vacation periods, the Guild is run by a Committee of Executive Officers. The makeup of the committee changed for the 2006–7 academic session as Guild Council adopted the outcomes of an executive review, albeit with numerous amendments, and has had several slight alterations since then.

There are currently 14 Executive officers, seven of which are full-time Sabbatical Officers, with the remaining seven being student 'non-sabbatical' officers. Five of these are Liberation Officers, whose remits focus on the liberation of certain groups that may face barriers or be disadvantaged within Higher Education, or may face barriers or be oppressed within wider society as well.

Warden

The Warden's role is to act as a safety net and make sure that the Guild is always in the right hands. Unlike other officers, the Warden may not be a student, and holds a three-year term of office. He/she has an advisory role and some disciplinary duties, but the main task is to step in and administer the Guild in the unlikely event that all of the Executive Officer posts become vacant. Without the Warden, it is likely under English Law that in this circumstance, administration would pass to the university. While seemingly unlikely, there has been an occasion in the Guild's history when Guild Council saw fit to dismiss the entire Executive, at which point the Warden of the day stepped in and immediately held fresh elections.

Finances

The Guild has an annual turnover of approximately £5.5 million.

A large portion of that money is the block grant, an annual sum of money from the university. In 2016–2017, this was £1.8 million, equivalent to approximately £50 per student. The Guild also receives money for the performance of several service contracts. One of the most significant of these is the £350,000 for the Student Mentor Scheme, equivalent to £75 per hall resident. The Residence Associations also receive grants from the university equal to £100 per hall resident.

Most of the rest of the Guild's turnover is through its venues trading activity.

Media controversy

Over the 2005–2006 academic session, the Guild made national and international press over several controversial issues.

The year started with President Richard Angell banning the National Blood Service from the Guild's popular Freshers' Fair over the service's policy of banning gay and bisexual men from giving blood for life.  This policy remained in effect until it was overturned at the start of the 2009–2010 academic year.

In January 2006, a row erupted as the Guild became aware of and subsequently took issue with some of the policies sought by its Evangelical Christian Union society. The Union sought not to allow non-Christians to become members, have the outgoing leaders appoint new leaders (rather than have the members elect them), and require members to sign an evangelical doctrinal quasi-contract. Although the Union later agreed to hold elections, the Union members felt that their religious beliefs prevented them from being able to make any more concessions. The Guild stated that they believed the law prevented them from accommodating the society, as student unions are required to make all of their activities available to all students. The Christian Union stated that they believed they were being deprived of their legal rights. Guild Council ultimately derecognised the society, although it was subsequently re-admitted to the Guild in 2013 .

At Guild Council in June 2006, President Richard Angell proposed a motion titled 'Ding Dong the Witch is Dead' that the Guild should 'have a party' on the occasion of former Prime Minister Margaret Thatcher's death, which was met with widespread criticism, even making The Times national newspaper.

In 2013, The Guild joined several other University unions in banning the song Blurred Lines by Robin Thicke from being played at club night Fab'N'Fresh. The boycott of the song was prompted by media outcry over the sexually explicit lyrics, which many deemed misogynistic and apologist regarding rape culture.

In 2019, a Pro-Life society within The Guild was established, which was founded by students advocating for the outlawing of abortion in the UK. This sparked debate amongst students about whether or not opinions on civil rights should be allowed as a basis for a society. In retaliation, a Pro-choice society was quickly established to provide a group for students who advocate for the protection safe and legal abortion practices.

References

Further reading

External links
 Guild of Students Website

Guild of Students
Birmingham